Growing Up Hip Hop: New York is the third installment of the Growing Up Hip Hop reality television franchise on WE tv. The series premiered on August 29, 2019, and chronicles the lives of the children of hip hop legends in New York City.

Cast

Main
Jeffrey Atkins, Jr., Ja Rule's son
Brittney Atkins, Ja Rule's daughter
Da'Zyna Drayton, Flavor Flav's daughter
Young Dirty Bastard, Ol' Dirty Bastard's son
Ryan Cartagena, Fat Joe's son
Vina Love, Kid Capri's daughter
Angie Pearson, Irv Gotti's daughter
JJ Lorenzo, Irv Gotti's son
Siaani Love, Charli Baltimore's daughter
Jojo Simmons, Rev Run's son

Recurring
Ja Rule
Irv Gotti
Fat Joe
Flavor Flav
Kid Capri
Charli Baltimore
Quan, Flavor Flav's son
Will, Flavor Flav's son
Lil Mama
Madina Milana, talent manager
Taniqua, Ol' Dirty Bastard's daughter
Angela Simmons, Rev Run's daughter
Arnstar, Lil Mama's brother
Deb, Irv Gotti's ex-wife

Guests
Vanessa Simmons
Tanice Amira
Lil' Eazy-E
Aisha Atkins

Episodes

References

2010s American reality television series
2019 American television series debuts
Hip hop television
African-American reality television series